Chorni Klobuky or Chornye Klobuki, meaning "black hats" (from  and ) was a generic name for a group of semi-nomadic Turkic tribes of Berendei, Torki, Kovui of Chernihiv, Pechenegs, and others that at the end of 11th century settled on the southern frontier of Kiev and Pereyaslav principalities along the Ros River valley. They are first mentioned in the Kiev Chronicles of 1146.

In the 12th century many of these tribes became sedentary and town-based (within modern Cherkasy and southern Kiev oblasts). Their main city was Torchesk (next to the modern city of Kaharlyk). They also were used by Rus' princes for the defense of their southern borders against Cumans and took part in the political life of Kievan Rus'. After the Mongol invasion they were partially assimilated by neighboring people and partially deported by the Golden Horde rulers such as Uzbeg Khan (between 1340-1390) to the Central Asia.

Their name means "Black Hats" or "Black Hoods", and in Turkic languages it is "Karakalpak"; presumably this refers to their national costume.  It is unclear whether the Chornyi Klobuki are related to the Karakalpaks of today.

In the Moscow Chronicle collection of the 15th century under the year 1152 it explains that all Chorni Klobuky were called Circassians as they arrived from the north Caucasus.

Klym Polishchuk's short story “God of Chorni Klobuky” is based on a Ukrainian legend. The story comprises Treasure of the Ages: Ukrainian Legends [Skarby vikiv: Ukrainski Lehendy].

See also
 Karapapakhs

References

External links
 Chorni Klobuky in the Encyclopedia of Ukraine
 Pechenegs. Ukraine - History of a Great Nation.

Turkic peoples of Europe
Pechenegs
Kipchaks
Medieval Ukraine